Synchytrium liquidambaris is a plant pathogen infecting sweetgum trees.

References

External links 
 Index Fungorum
 USDA ARS Fungal Database

Fungal tree pathogens and diseases
Chytridiomycota
Fungi described in 1953